Emathia was the name of the plain opposite the Thermaic Gulf when the kingdom of Macedon was formed. The name was used to define the area between the rivers Aliakmon and Loudias, which, because it was the center of the kingdom, was also called Macedonia. Emathia was one of the six earliest provinces of Macedon and was bordered on the west by Orestis, on the north was separated from Bisaltia by river Loudias, and on the south was separated from Pieria by river Aliakmon.

Etymology
Emathia was named after the Samothracian king Emathion and not after the local Emathus. The etymology of the name is of Homeric Greek origin - ‘amathos’= sandy soil, opp. to sea-sand (psámathos = ψάμαθος); in plural the links or dunes by the sea, [compare  êmathóeis = ἠμαθόεις/ἠμᾰθόεις (masc.), ēmathóessa = ἠμαθόεσσα (fem.), ēmathóen = ἠμαθόεν (neut.) epic for amathóeis/ámathos = ἀμᾰθόεις ἄμαθος and êmathoessa (see above) 'sandy', i. e. the coastal, sandy/swampy land around Axius river, in contrast to mountainous Macedonia, probably also intended as 'laying large land' (cf. PIE *mē-2, *m-e-t- 'to mow, to reap').

Classical sources
Homer, who makes no mention of Macedonia, places Emathia as a region next to Pieria.

The Homeric name was renewed mainly in Roman times and Ptolemy mentions some cities of Emathia.
In Nonnus, Dionysiaca 48.6 Typhoeus having stripped the mountains of Emathia, he cast the rocky missiles at Dionysus. In Ovid, Metamorphoses 5.313 the daughters of Pierus say: we grant Emathia's plains, to where uprise Paeonia's peaks of snow. The Emathian or Emathius dux is a frequently used name by Latin poets for Alexander the Great, as in Milton, the Emathian conqueror . Strabo   relates that what is now called Macedonia was in earlier times called Emathia but since Homer, the earliest source considers Emathia only a region next to Pieria, Strabo's reference should be interpreted in the Roman era context of Emathia's name reviving. The same stands for Latin writers who name Thessaly as Emathia ; Macedonia (Roman province) included Thessaly. In 12.462 of Metamorphoses, an Emathian Halesus is killed by the centaur Latreus and in Catullus 64. 324, Peleus is Emathiae tutamen (protector).

Polybius (23.10.4) mentions that Emathia was earliest called Paeonia and Strabo (frg 7.38) that Paeonia was extended to Pieria and Pelagonia. According to Hammond the references are related to Bronze Age period before the Trojan War.

Towns
The most important towns of Emathia were:

Aigai (first capital and holy city of Macedonia)
Beria (modern Veria)
Kition (modern Naoussa)
Alexander the Great with settlers from this area founded Emathia in Syria.

References

Locations in Greek mythology
Geography of ancient Macedonia
Locations in the Iliad
Plains of Greece